Tiriolo is a town and comune in the province of Catanzaro in the Calabria region of southern Italy. It was the birthplace of Renaissance painter Marco Cardisco.

"The houses in the historic center, perched like in a nativity scene, make up the old part of the town, while the new buildings extend along the foot of the hill, nestled between the mountain and the valleys.

Legend traces the origins of the settlement of Tiriolo back to Hellenic people six centuries before the Trojan War or even identifies it with the mythical Scherìa, the happy homeland of the Homeric people of the Phaeacians. Archaeological findings, however, support the hypothesis of the existence of a dwelling nucleus since the Neolithic, as revealed by finds such as polished axes, rudimentary chisels and obsidian scrapers. The subsequent Roman presence finds its most relevant testimony in the famous bronze tablet engraved with a text concerning the Senatus Consultum de Bacchanalibus, a decree of the second century. AC. with which the Roman senate prohibited the Bacchanalia, orgiastic rites in which even the elites participated and therefore considers it the context of possible conspiracies against the state. The artefact, found in 1640, is now in the Kunsthistorisches Museum in Vienna, offered in 1727 as a tribute to the Emperor Charles VI of Habsburg."

Geography
The town is bordered by Catanzaro, Gimigliano, Marcellinara, Miglierina, San Pietro Apostolo and Settingiano.

Gallery

Notes and references

External links

 Tourist Association

Cities and towns in Calabria